"Thinkin' Problem" is a song co-written and recorded by American country music singer David Ball.  Ball co-wrote the song with Allen Shamblin and Stuart Ziff.  It was released in March 1994 as the lead-off single and title track from his album Thinkin' Problem.  The song reached number 2 on the Hot Country Singles & Tracks (now Hot Country Songs) chart, and number 1 on Canada's RPM country chart. It also earned Ball a nomination for the Grammy Award for Best Male Country Vocal Performance at the 37th Annual Grammy Awards in 1995.

Content
"Thinkin' Problem" is a moderate up-tempo with electric guitar, pedal steel guitar, and fiddle flourishes. In it, the male narrator states that he has a "thinkin' problem" (meant as a play on the term "drinking problem") because he is constantly thinking about his former significant other despite numerous attempts to quit. The song begins with the famous phrase "Yes I admit, I've got a thinkin' problem", with the final syllable of the word "admit" drawn out.

Music video
The music video was directed by O Pictures and premiered in early 1994.

Critical reception
Rick Cohoon of Allmusic gave the song a mixed review, saying that it "is the fuel that ignited Ball's launch into stardom" but that "he tends to over-nasalize to the point of annoyance." Deborah Evans Price, of Billboard magazine reviewed the song favorably calling it a "perfect combination of retro sensibility and '90s production, and a pure honky-tonk delight."

Parody
Cledus T. Judd, a country music parodist, parodied the song as "Stinkin' Problem" on his 1995 debut album Cledus T. Judd (No Relation).

Chart positions
"Thinkin' Problem" debuted at number 72 on the U.S. Billboard Hot Country Singles & Tracks for the week of April 16, 1994.

Year-end charts

References

1994 singles
1994 songs
David Ball (country singer) songs
Songs written by Allen Shamblin
Song recordings produced by Blake Chancey
Warner Records singles
Songs written by David Ball (country singer)